Professor John Dickie (born 1963) is a British author, historian and academic who specialises in Italy.

Education 
Born in Dundee, he was brought up in Leicestershire and went to Loughborough Grammar School. He studied Modern Languages at Pembroke College, Oxford, obtaining a Bachelor's degree with first class honours. He continued his studies at the University of Sussex, completing a Master's degree and becoming a Doctor of Philosophy.

Career 
He is Professor of Italian Studies at University College London, where he has taught since 1993. According to the American Historical Review :  John Dickie is a leading member of a group of young historians working in British universities with a distinctive revisionist thrust to their work on modern and contemporary Italian history. They do not shy away from theory, whether historiographical or broadly social scientific, and are happy to challenge past and current monstres sacres, from Denis Mack Smith to Edward Said.

Bibliography and publications 
Dickie is the author of various books: 
 Darkest Italy. The Nation and Stereotypes of the Mezzogiorno, 1860-1900 (New York, 1999), 
 Cosa Nostra: A History Of The Sicilian Mafia (2004),   A "fine achievement" according to Professor Jane Schneider, in European History Quarterly (2008) 38#1 p.129-132.
 Delizia! The Epic History of Italians and their Food (2007), 
 Una catastrofe patriottica. 1908: il terremoto di Messina (A Patriotic Catastrophe. 1908: The Earthquake of Messina, Rome, 2008), 
 Blood Brotherhoods: the Rise of the Italian Mafias (2011) 
 Mafia Republic: Italy's Criminal Curse. Cosa Nostra, 'Ndrangheta and Camorra from 1946 to the Present (2014). 
In 2020 he published The Craft – How the Freemasons Made the Modern World.

Research interests 
He states his research interests as "Representations of the Italian South, Italian nationalism and national identities, cultural history of liberal Italy, cultural and critical theory, organized crime, Italian food."

Awards 
In 2005 President of the Italian Republic awarded him the Commendatore dell'Ordine della Stella della Solidarietà Italiana (Commander of the Order of the Star of Italian Solidarity), an Italian knighthood.

Personal life 
In 2005 he married the author Sarah Penny; they have three children.

References

External links
 http://www.johndickie.net
 https://www.ucl.ac.uk/selcs/people/italian-staff/john-dickie

1963 births
People educated at Loughborough Grammar School
Alumni of Pembroke College, Oxford
Alumni of the University of Sussex
Historians of the Sicilian Mafia
Academics of University College London
Living people
Writers from Dundee
People from Dundee